The Flexner Report is a book-length landmark report of medical education in the United States and Canada, written by Abraham Flexner and published in 1910 under the aegis of the Carnegie Foundation. Many aspects of the present-day American medical profession stem from the Flexner Report and its aftermath. The Flexner report has been criticized for introducing policies that encouraged systemic racism.

The Report, also called Carnegie Foundation Bulletin Number Four, called on American medical schools to enact higher admission and graduation standards, and to adhere strictly to the protocols of mainstream science in their teaching and research. The report talked about the need for revamping and centralizing medical institutions. Many American medical schools fell short of the standard advocated in the Flexner Report and, subsequent to its publication, nearly half of such schools merged or were closed outright. Colleges in electrotherapy were closed.

Homeopathy, traditional osteopathy, eclectic medicine, and physiomedicalism (botanical therapies that had not been tested scientifically) were derided.

The Report also concluded that there were too many medical schools in the United States, and that too many doctors were being trained. A repercussion of the Flexner Report, resulting from the closure or consolidation of university training, was the closure of all but two "negro" medical schools and the reversion of American universities to male-only admittance programs to accommodate a smaller admission pool. Universities had begun opening and expanding female admissions as part of women's and co-educational facilities only in the mid-to-latter part of the 19th century with the founding of co-educational Oberlin College in 1833 and private colleges such as Vassar College and Pembroke College.

Background

In 1904, the American Medical Association (AMA) created the Council on Medical Education (CME), whose objective was to restructure American medical education. At its first annual meeting, the CME adopted two standards: one laid down the minimum prior education required for admission to a medical school; the other defined a medical education as consisting of two years training in human anatomy and physiology followed by two years of clinical work in a teaching hospital. Generally speaking, the council strove to improve the quality of medical students, looking to draw from the society of upper-class, educated students.

In 1908, seeking to advance its reformist agenda and hasten the elimination of schools that failed to meet its standards, the CME contracted with the Carnegie Foundation for the Advancement of Teaching to survey American medical education. Henry Pritchett, president of the Carnegie Foundation and a staunch advocate of medical school reform, chose Abraham Flexner to conduct the survey. Neither a physician, a scientist, nor a medical educator, Flexner  held a Bachelor of Arts degree and operated a for-profit school in Louisville, Kentucky. He visited every one of the 155 North American medical schools then in operation, all of which differed greatly in their curricula, methods of assessment, and requirements for admission and graduation. Summarizing his findings, he wrote:

The Report became notorious for its harsh description of certain establishments, describing Chicago's fourteen medical schools, for example, as "a disgrace to the State whose laws permit its existence . . . indescribably foul . . . the plague spot of the nation." Nevertheless, several schools received praise for excellent performance, including Western Reserve (now Case Western Reserve), Michigan, Wake Forest, McGill, Toronto, and particularly Johns Hopkins, which was described as the 'model for medical education'.

Recommended changes
To help with the transition and change the minds of other doctors and scientists, John D. Rockefeller gave many millions to colleges, hospitals and founded a philanthropic front group called "General Education Board" (GEB).

When Flexner researched his report, many American medical schools were small "proprietary" trade schools owned by one or more doctors, unaffiliated with a college or university, and run to make a profit. A degree was typically awarded after only two years of study with laboratory work and dissection optional. Many of the instructors were local doctors teaching part-time. Regulation of the medical profession by state governments was minimal or nonexistent. American doctors varied enormously in their scientific understanding of human physiology, and the word "quack" was in common use.

Flexner carefully examined the situation. Using the Johns Hopkins School of Medicine as the ideal, he issued the following recommendations:
 Reduce the number of medical schools (from 155 to 31) and the number of poorly trained physicians;
 Increase the prerequisites to enter medical training;
 Train physicians to practice in a scientific manner and engage medical faculty in research;
 Give medical schools control of clinical instruction in hospitals
 Strengthen state regulation of medical licensure

Flexner expressed that he found Hopkins to be a "small but ideal medical school, embodying in a novel way, adapted to American conditions, the best features of medical education in England, France, and Germany." In his efforts to ensure that Hopkins was the standard to which all other medical schools in the United States were compared, Flexner went on to claim that all the other medical schools were subordinate in relation to this "one bright spot." Flexner believed that admission to a medical school should require, at minimum, a high school diploma and at least two years of college or university study, primarily devoted to basic science. When Flexner researched his report, only 16 out of 155 medical schools in the United States and Canada required applicants to have completed two or more years of university education. By 1920, 92 percent of U.S. medical schools required this of applicants. Flexner also argued that the length of medical education should be four years, and its content should be what the CME agreed to in 1905. Flexner recommended that the proprietary medical schools should either close or be incorporated into existing universities. He stated that medical schools needed be part of a larger university since a proper stand-alone medical school would have to charge too much in order to break even financially.

Less known is Flexner's recommendation that medical schools appoint full-time clinical professors. Holders of these appointments would become "true university teachers, barred from all but charity practice, in the interest of teaching." Flexner pursued this objective for years, despite widespread opposition from existing medical faculty.

Flexner was the child of German immigrants, and had studied and traveled in Europe. He was well aware that one could not practice medicine in continental Europe without having undergone an extensive specialized university education. In effect, Flexner demanded that American medical education conform to prevailing practice in continental Europe.

By and large, medical schools in Canada and the United States followed many of Flexner's recommendations. However, schools have increased their emphasis on matters of public health.

Consequences of the report
Many aspects of the medical profession in North America changed following the Flexner Report. Medical training adhered more closely to the scientific method and became grounded in human physiology and biochemistry. Medical research aligned more fully with the protocols of scientific research. Average physician quality significantly increased.

Medical school closings
Flexner sought to reduce the number of medical schools in the US. A majority of American institutions granting MD or DO degrees as of the date of the Report (1910) closed within two to three decades. (In Canada, only the medical school at Western University was deemed inadequate, but none was closed or merged subsequent to the Report.) In 1904, there were 160 MD-granting institutions with more than 28,000 students. By 1920, there were only 85 MD-granting institutions, educating only 13,800 students. By 1935, there were only 66 medical schools operating in the US.

Between 1910 and 1935, more than half of all American medical schools merged or closed. The dramatic decline was in some part due to the implementation of the Report's recommendation that all "proprietary" schools be closed and that medical schools should henceforth all be connected to universities. Of the 66 surviving MD-granting institutions in 1935, 57 were part of a university. An important factor driving the mergers and closures of medical schools was that all state medical boards gradually adopted and enforced the Report's recommendations. In response to the Report, some schools fired senior faculty members as part of a process of reform and renewal.

Impact on African-American doctors and patients
The Flexner report has been criticized for introducing policies that encouraged systemic racism and sexism. 

Flexner advocated closing all but two of the historically black medical schools. As a result, only Howard University College of Medicine and Meharry Medical College were left open, while five other schools were closed. Flexner's view was that black doctors should treat only black patients and should play roles subservient to those of white physicians. The closure of the five schools, and the fact that black students were not admitted to many U.S. medical schools for the next 50 years, has contributed to the low numbers of American-born physicians of color, and the ramifications are still felt more than a century later.

Flexner's findings also restricted opportunities for African-American physicians in the medical sphere. Even the Howard and Meharry schools struggled to stay open following the Flexner Report, having to meet the institutional requirements of white medical schools, reflecting a divide in access to health care between white and African-Americans. Following the Flexner Report, African-American students sued universities, challenging the precedent set by Plessy v. Ferguson. However, those students were met by opposition from schools, who remained committed to segregated medical education. It was not until 15 years after Brown v. Board of Education in 1954 that the AAMC ensured access to medical education for African-Americans and minorities by supporting the diversification of medical schools.

Along with his adherence to germ theory, Flexner argued that, if not properly trained and treated, African-Americans posed a health threat to middle and upper-class whites.

The view that Flexner and his report were detrimental to Black medical schools is largely refuted by Thomas N. Bonner, a scholar referred to as a “distinguished historian” by the AAMC.  Bonner contended that Flexner worked to save the two Black medical schools that were graduating most of the Black physicians at that time.

Impact on alternative medicine
When Flexner researched his report, "modern" medicine faced vigorous competition from several quarters, including osteopathic medicine, chiropractic medicine, electrotherapy, eclectic medicine, naturopathy, and homeopathy. Flexner clearly doubted the scientific validity of all forms of medicine other than that based on scientific research, deeming any approach to medicine that did not advocate the use of treatments such as vaccines to prevent and cure illness as tantamount to quackery and charlatanism.  Medical schools that offered training in various disciplines including electromagnetic field therapy, phototherapy, eclectic medicine, physiomedicalism, naturopathy, and homeopathy, were told either to drop these courses from their curriculum or lose their accreditation and underwriting support. A few schools resisted for a time, but eventually most complied with the Report or shut their doors.

Impact on osteopathic medicine
Although almost all the alternative medical schools listed in Flexner's report were closed, the American Osteopathic Association (AOA) brought a number of osteopathic medical schools into compliance with Flexner's recommendations to produce an evidence-based practice. The curricula of DO- and MD-awarding medical schools are now nearly identical, the chief difference being the additional instruction in osteopathic schools of osteopathic manipulative medicine.

Impact on role of physician 
The vision for medical education described in the Flexner Report narrowed medical schools' interests to disease, and not on the system of health care or society's health beyond disease. Preventive medicine and population health were not considered a responsibility of physicians, bifurcating "health" into two separate fields: scientific medicine and public health.

See also
Committee of Ten

References

Further reading
 
 Bonner, Thomas Neville, 2002. Iconoclast: Abraham Flexner and a Life in Learning. Johns Hopkins Univ. Press. .
 Gevitz, Norman, and Grant, U. S., 2004. The D.O.s (2nd ed.). Baltimore: The Johns Hopkins University Press. .
 Starr, Paul, 1982. The Social Transformation of American Medicine. Basic Books. .
 Wheatley, S. C., 1989. The Politics of Philanthropy: Abraham Flexner and Medical Education. University of Wisconsin Press. , .

External links
 The Flexner Report (PDF) from the Carnegie Foundation for the Advancement of Teaching
 "Flexner Report Transformed Med Schools", All Things Considered, 16 August 2008.
 The Flexner Report ― 100 Years Later (September 2011)

Medical education in the United States
Medical education in Canada
Osteopathic medicine
History of medicine in the United States